The Bückeberg Formation is a geologic formation and Lagerstätte in Germany. It preserves fossils dating back to the Berriasian of the Cretaceous period. The Bückeberg Formation has previously been considered to constitute the "German Wealden" in reference to its similarity to the Wealden Group in the United Kingdom. More recently it has been considered a group, containing the Isterberg and Deister Formations. The plesiosaur Brancasaurus, an indeterminate ankylosaur referred to Hylaeosaurus, the turtle Dorsetochelys are known from the formation.

See also 
 List of fossiliferous stratigraphic units in Germany

References

Bibliography 

    
     
  
   
   

Geologic formations of Germany
Lower Cretaceous Series of Europe
Cretaceous Germany
Berriasian Stage
Mudstone formations
Sandstone formations
Coal formations
Coal in Germany
Deltaic deposits
Fluvial deposits
Ichnofossiliferous formations
Lagerstätten
Fossiliferous stratigraphic units of Europe
Paleontology in Germany